herchurch is another name used for the Ebenezer Lutheran Church in San Francisco, a congregation within the Evangelical Lutheran Church in America (ELCA). The church is a member of the San Francisco Council of Lutheran Churches.
Stacy Boorn, the minister for herchurch, uses feminist theology in the church's expression of faith, worship, learning, mutual care, and acts of justice. Its former Associate Pastor is Megan Rohrer, who is transgender. Rohrer was ordained extraordinarily, at the time in defiance of the ELCA rules. Rohrer is rostered by Extraordinary Lutheran Ministries, which is "committed to the full participation of persons of all sexual orientations and gender identities in the life and ministry of the Lutheran church."

Stacy Boorn, the minister for herchurch, uses feminist theology in the church's expression of faith, worship, learning, mutual care, and acts of justice. Its former Associate Pastor is Megan Rohrer, who is transgender. Rohrer was ordained extraordinarily, at the time in defiance of the ELCA rules. Rohrer was elected to the office of bishop of the Sierra Pacific Synod of The ELCA in May, 2021. Bishop Rohrer began their (Rohrer uses gender-neutral singular they pronouns) six year term as bishop in September, 2021. Previously, Rohrer was rostered by Extraordinary Lutheran Ministries, which is "committed to the full participation of persons of all sexual orientations and gender identities in the life and ministry of the Lutheran church." In December 2021, however, Rohrer was suspended from the ELM membership roster for alleged "racist words and actions".

Since 2007, Ebenezer Lutheran has annually on the first weekend in November sponsored a three-day conference on faith and feminism, often with a focus on reviving traditions of honoring the sacred feminine as manifested in the Hellenistic and Jewish concept of Sophia, and in the faith-traditions of minorities. The 2009 conference focused on the pseudohistorical idea that Jesus was married to Mary Magdalene, an idea featured prominently in Dan Brown's famous novel The Da Vinci Code.

See also

Christian feminism
Christian left
Christianity and homosexuality
Christopaganism
Gender roles in Christianity
Goddess movement
Herstory
Liberal Christianity
Liberation theology
Metropolitan Community Church
Political theology
Progressive Christianity
Queer theology
Religious pluralism
Thealogy

References

External links

Feminism in California
Churches in San Francisco
Lutheran churches in California
Protestant feminism
Liberal Christianity denominations
LGBT and Lutheranism